Yash Thakur (born 28 December 1998) is an Indian cricketer. He made his List A debut for Vidarbha in the 2016–17 Vijay Hazare Trophy on 25 February 2017. He made his first-class debut for Vidarbha in the 2018–19 Ranji Trophy on 28 November 2018. He made his Twenty20 debut for Vidarbha in the 2018–19 Syed Mushtaq Ali Trophy on 21 February 2019. On 8 December 2021, on the opening day of the 2021–22 Vijay Hazare Trophy, Thakur took his first five-wicket haul in List A cricket.

References

External links
 

1998 births
Living people
Indian cricketers
Vidarbha cricketers
Cricketers from Kolkata